The Interloper is a fictional character appearing in American comic books published by Marvel Comics. He is a member of the Eternals.

Publication history
The Interloper first appeared in Defenders #147 (September 1985), and was created by Peter B. Gillis and Don Perlin.

The character subsequently appeared in Defenders #149 (November 1985), #151-152 (January–February 1986), Strange Tales Vol. 2 #5-7 (August–October 1987), and Doctor Strange: Sorcerer Supreme #3-4 (March–May 1989)

The Interloper received an entry in the Official Handbook of the Marvel Universe Deluxe Edition #6.

Fictional character biography
Little has been revealed. He does know the Eternal Gilgamesh (aka the Forgotten One), and has been fighting the Dragon of the Moon for centuries, both on Saturn's moon Titan and on Earth. Their last battle was during the 6th Century AD.

He lived as a hermit for the following hundreds of years. He was discovered by Manslaughter, and, impressed, the Interloper trained Manslaughter. Later, when the Dragon of the Moon enslaved Moondragon, the Interloper confronted and then joined Moondragon's team, the Defenders, in battling Moondragon and the Dragon of the Moon. In the battle, the Interloper tried to hurl his life force against the Dragon; he was transformed into a statue that crumbled into dust. Due to the intervention of the Vishanti, Interloper's life-force has been merged with the body of Will Fanshawe, a Welsh truck driver; they share possession of this body, which can now transform into an exact duplicate of Interloper's old body, including all of his Eternal powers. No more than 2 years later, he then defeated Moondragron by using his new schema to his advantage.

Reception
 In 2021, CBR.com ranked Interloper 10th in their "15 Most Powerful Eternals" list.
 In 2021, Screen Rant ranked Interloper 10th in their "10 Most Powerful Members Of The Eternals" list

References

External links
 

tl:Interloper (komiks)

Comics characters introduced in 1985
Eternals (comics)
Fictional characters with energy-manipulation abilities
Fictional characters with immortality
Fictional characters with superhuman durability or invulnerability
Fictional illusionists
Marvel Comics characters who can move at superhuman speeds
Marvel Comics characters who can teleport
Marvel Comics characters with accelerated healing
Marvel Comics characters with superhuman strength